Trondenes District Court was a district court located in the town of Harstad in Troms county, Norway. The court served the southwestern part of the county which included the municipalities of Harstad, Kvæfjord, Skånland, and Ibestad. The court was subordinate to the Hålogaland Court of Appeal. The court was led by the chief judge Kirsti Ramberg. This court employed a chief judge and two other judges.

The court was a court of first instance. Its judicial duties were mainly to settle criminal cases and to resolve civil litigation as well as bankruptcy. The administration and registration tasks of the court included death registration, issuing certain certificates, performing duties of a notary public, and officiating civil wedding ceremonies. Cases from this court were heard by a combination of professional judges and lay judges.

History
The Trondenes District Court was established on 1 January 1917 when it was split off from the Senja District Court. On 26 April 2021, Trondenes District Court was merged with the Ofoten District Court and Vesterålen District Court to create the new Midtre Hålogaland District Court.

References

Defunct district courts of Norway
Organisations based in Harstad
1917 establishments in Norway
2021 disestablishments in Norway